Bodoni is a typeface.

Bodoni may also refer to:

 Bodoni (surname), list of people with the surname
 The Bodoni Museum, Parma-based museum devoted to Giambattista Bodoni
 Officina Bodoni, private press named after Giambattista Bodoni